Thulasi Maadam is a 1963 Indian Tamil-language romantic drama film directed by K. B. Srinivasan and written by Thamizhmaaran. The film stars A. V. M. Rajan, Gemini Chandraknatha (in dual roles), V. Gopalakrishnan and Sharadha.

Plot 
Mary and Janaki are two look-alike women but they are not related to each other. Mary is the daughter of a retired collector and Janaki is from a middle class family. Mary is affianced to Thomas, an army officer while Janaki is married to a company executive. Janaki gives birth to a child. Janaki is found to have tuberculosis. So, her mother-in-law separates her from the child. In the meantime, Janaki's mother dies. The mother-in-law's adopted son Peter takes pity of the separated Janaki and her child. Accidentally he meets Mary, the look-alike of Janaki. Peter comes out with a clever plan and swaps Mary in place of Janaki. Several complications arise and finally the families are united.

Cast 
The list is adapted from The Hindu article.

 A. V. M. Rajan as Company Executive
 Gemini Chandrakantha as Mary and Janaki
 V. Gopalakrishnan as Thomas
 Sharadha
 S. N. Lakshmi
 M. S. Sundari Bai
 Master Gopal as Peter
 Seethalakshmi
 A. Karunanidhi
 S. Kathiresan

Production 
The film was produced by M. A. Venu who earlier produced award winning films like Sampoorna Ramayanam and Mudhalali. Screenplay and dialogues were written by Thamizhmaran.

Soundtrack 
Music was composed by K. V. Mahadevan while the lyrics were penned by Ka. Mu. Sheriff and Thiruchi Thiyagarajan. The song "Aadum Mayile Aattam Engey", sung by T. M. Soundararajan became a super hit.

Reception 
Writing for Sport and Pastime, T. M. Ramachandran said the director "has shown much courage in tackling a ticklish subject". The film did not fare well at the box office.

References

External links

1963 romantic drama films
1960s Tamil-language films
1963 films
Films scored by K. V. Mahadevan
Indian black-and-white films
Indian romantic drama films